Margh-e Chenar (also Romanized as Margh-e Chenār) is a village in Sadat Mahmudi Rural District, Pataveh District, Dana County, Kohgiluyeh and Boyer-Ahmad Province, Iran. At the 2006 census, its population was 88, in 16 families.

References 

Populated places in Dana County